is a swing/jazz band with punk influences, formed in 1997, with its major label debut on Epic Records Japan in 2004. They are perhaps best known in the US for the opening theme to the Japanese series Kemonozume, "Auvers Blue" as well as the first opening to the anime Gallery Fake, "Ragtime". They also performed a cover of Cole Porter's "You'd Be So Nice to Come Home To" with fellow Sony Music Japan artist Mika Nakashima, which was released on the Katteni-Shiyagare tribute album and also included with her single Eien no Uta.

Members
  (trumpet)
  (trombone and vocals)
  (drums and lead vocals)
  (double bass)
  (tenor saxophone)
  (baritone saxophone)
  (piano)

External links
 Official site
 Interview with the band

Japanese rock music groups
Sony Music Entertainment Japan artists